Reinoud II van Brederode (Santpoort, 1415 – Vianen, 16 October 1473) was Lord of Vianen, Ameide, Lexmond, Hei- en Boeicop, Meerkerk,  and Twaalfhoven.

Life
He was the son of Walraven I van Brederode and Johanna van Vianen. His uncle William van Brederode ruled as regent during his minority until 1438, when Reinoud was officially named Lord. In 1445 he was made a knight of the Order of the Golden Fleece and was also appointed burgrave of Utrecht. Reinoud came to his brother Gijsbrecht van Brederode's aid in the bishop's dispute with David of Burgundy, who however managed to capture Reinoud in 1470, and had him tortured. Charles the Bold set him free, but the captivity and torture had taken its toll on Reinoud, who would never be the same.

Family
Reinoud married with Elisabeth, or Lijsbeth Willems in 1440. He had many children with Elisabeth, but the marriage was not recognised and the children were given bastard status. Around 1458, Reinoud married Yolanda de Lalaing, a daughter of William de Lalaing.

Reinoud had the following children with Elisabeth, his first wife:
Walraven van Brederode  ± 1440–????
Reinier van Brederode  ± 1444–± 1481
Hendrik van Brederode  ± 1447–????
Johan van Brederode  ± 1450–????
Johan van Brederode  ± 1452–????
Johanna van Brederode  ± 1455–????
Joost van Brederode  ± 1457–????

Reinoud had the following children with Yolanda, his second wife:
Josina van Brederode  ± 1458–????
Johanna van Brederode  ± 1459–????
Walravina van Brederode  ± 1460–± 1500
Anna van Brederode  ± 1461–????
Walraven II van Brederode  1462–1531, successor
Frans van Brederode  1465–± 1490
Yolande van Brederode  ± 1467–????

External links 
 Biography the Nieuw Nederlandsch biografisch woordenboek. Part 10 (1937) (Dutch)

References 

 Johannes a Leydis, Opusculum de gestis regalium abbatum monasterii sancti Athalberti ordinis sancti Benedicti in Egmonda (written between 1477 and 1484).
 Willem Procurator, (translated by M. Gumbert-Hepp; J.P. Gumbert (ed.), Kroniek. Hilversum, Publisher Verloren, 2001.
 Nederlandsche leeuw 1960.

1415 births
1473 deaths
Knights of the Golden Fleece
Reinoud 02
People from Velsen
15th-century people of the Holy Roman Empire